Paigah may refer to:

 House of Paigah, the senior nobility of Hyderabad State aristocracy
 Paigah, Punjab, a town in the Punjab Province of Pakistan